Maaranen is a Finnish surname. Notable people with the surname include:

Annamari Maaranen (born 1986), Finnish artistic gymnast
Steve Maaranen (1947–2019), American cyclist

Finnish-language surnames